The 1933–34 British Home Championship was an annual international football tournament played between the British Home Nations during the 1933–34 football season. It was won by Wales, whose run of form during the 1930s was their last sustained period of international success in the team's history. In taking the title they beat both favourites England and the poor Scots, holding Ireland to a score draw. England came second with commanding victories over Scotland and Ireland but suffering defeat to the Welsh on home turf in Newcastle. Ireland also managed victory over the Scots but were well beaten by England and could only draw with Wales to take third place.

Table

Results

References

 British Home Championship 1919-20 to 1938-1939  - dates, results, tables and top scorers at RSSSF

1933–34 in English football
1933–34 in Scottish football
Brit
1934 in British sport
1933-34
1933–34 in Northern Ireland association football